Utricularia subg. Utricularia is a subgenus in the genus Utricularia.

See also 
 List of Utricularia species

References 

Utricularia
Plant subgenera